The following is a list of musical instruments from the Africa continent as well as their countries or regions of origin.

A
 Adungu (Uganda) 
 African fiddle
 African harp (Sub-Saharan)
 Agogô
 Ahoko
 Algerian mandole (Algeria)
 Amakondere (Uganda)
 Anglo concertina
 Arghul (North Africa)

B
 Balafon (Mali) 
 Banjo music
 Begena (Ethiopia)
 Belly harp (West Africa)
 Bendir 
 Bobre (Mauritius)

C
 Calabash (percussion)
 Castanets
 Cavaquinho (Mozmbique)

D
 Deze (Zimbabwe)

E
 Endingidi (Uganda)
 Endongo (Uganda)
 Erikundi

G
 Goblet drum
 Goema (South Africa)

H
 Hosho (instrument) (Zimbabwe)

I
 Ilimba (Tanzania)
 Ilimba drum (Zimbabwe)
 Inanga (instrument) (Burundi, Rwanda, Uganda, and parts of the Democratic Republic of Congo)

J
 Janzi (musical instrument) (Uganda)

K
 Kabosy (Madagascar)
 Kakaki (Ethiopia)
 Kalindula (Southern Africa)
 Kalumbu (Zimbabwe)
 Kayamb (Mauritius)
 Kebero (Ethiopia)
 Kissar (Ethiopia)
 Kontigi (West Africa)
 Krakebs (Algeria)
 Krar (Ethiopia)
 Kwitra (Algeria)

L
 Lamellophone
 Lesiba (Southern Africa)
 Litungu (Kenya)
 Lokanga bara (Madagascar)

M
 Malimbe (Congo) 
 Marovany (Madagascar)
 Matepe (Zimbabwe)
 Masenqo (Ethiopia)
 Mbira (Zimbabwe)
 Mišnice
 Mizwad (Algeria)
 Musical bow (Southern Africa)
 Msondo (Tanzania)

N
 Ndzendze (Comoros)
 Ndzumara (Comoros)
 Nyatiti (Kenya)
 Nyele (Zambia)

O
 Obokano (Kenya)
 Omubanda (Uganda)
 Omukuli (Uganda)
 Orutu (Kenya)
 Oud (Somalia)

R
 Rakatak (Ghana)
 Ralé-poussé (Réunion)
 Ramkie (Southern Africa)
 Ravanne (Mauritius)
 Rhaita (Morocco)
 Rock gong (West Africa)

S
 Segankuru (Botswana)
 Sintir (Algeria)
 Sistrum (Ethiopia)
 Slit drum (found throughout Africa) 
 Sodina (Madagascar)

T
 Taarija (Morocco)
 Tadghtita (Algeria)
 Tanbūra (lyre) (Somalia)
 Tar (drum)
 Taralila (Madagascar)
 Tbilat (Morocco)
 Tom (Ethiopian instrument) (Ethiopia)
 Trough zither (East and Central Africa)

U
 Udu (Nigeria)
 Uhadi musical bow (Southern Africa)

V
 Valiha (Madagascar)

W
 Washint (Ethiopia)
 Wazza (Sudan)

X
 Xalam (West Africa)
 Xylophone

Z
 Zeze (instrument) (Sub-Saharan Africa)
 Zukra (Libya)
 Zurna (Algeria)

African musical instruments